Stigmella aflatuniae is a moth of the family Nepticulidae. It is only known from Tajikistan.

The larvae feed on Afflatunia ulmifolia. They probably mine the leaves of their host plant.

External links
Checklist Of Nepticulidae Of Central Asia

Nepticulidae
Moths of Asia
Moths described in 1996